Anil Panachooran (20 November 1969 – 3 January 2021) was an Indian lawyer, poet and lyricist, who worked in the Malayalam film industry.
While undergoing treatment for COVID-19 during the COVID-19 pandemic in India, he died on 3 January 2021, following a cardiac arrest.

Filmography 

*He penned his last lyrics for the movie Within Seconds(2021).

Death 
While undergoing treatment for COVID-19 during the COVID-19 pandemic in India, he died on 3 January 2021, following a cardiac arrest.
Upon his death, relatives demanded a postmortem and police later registered a case of unnatural death.

Awards 

 Asianet Film award for best Lyricist 2008- Arabikadha, Kadha Parayumbol
 Filmfare award for best Lyricist 2008

References

External links 
 

1969 births
2021 deaths
Malayali people
People from Alappuzha district
Malayalam-language lyricists
Male actors from Kerala
Film musicians from Kerala
Singers from Kerala
21st-century Indian singers
21st-century Indian male actors
Male actors in Malayalam cinema
Indian male film actors
21st-century Indian composers
Deaths from the COVID-19 pandemic in India